This was the first edition of the tournament.

Ričardas Berankis won the title after defeating Yannick Hanfmann 6–3, 6–2 in the final.

Seeds

Draw

Finals

Top half

Bottom half

External links
Main Draw
Qualifying Draw

Shymkent Challenger - Singles
2017 Singles